The 2018–19 Western Illinois Leathernecks men's basketball team represented Western Illinois University during the 2018–19 NCAA Division I men's basketball season. The Leathernecks, led by fifth-year head coach Billy Wright, played their home games at Western Hall in Macomb, Illinois as members of the Summit League. They finished the season 10–21, 4–12 in Summit League play to finish in 8th place. They beat top-seeded South Dakota State in the quarterfinals of the Summit League tournament, before losing to North Dakota State in the semifinals.

Previous season
The Leathernecks finished the season 12–16, 3–11 in Summit League play to finish in last place. They lost in the quarterfinals of the Summit League tournament to South Dakota.

Roster

Schedule and results

|-
!colspan=9 style=| Exhibition

|-
!colspan=9 style=| Non-conference regular season

|-
!colspan=9 style=| Summit League regular season

|-
!colspan=9 style=| Summit League tournament

Source

References

Western Illinois Leathernecks men's basketball seasons
Western Illinois
Western
Western